Ōakura is a small coastal settlement in the Whangarei District and Northland Region of New Zealand's North Island.

The local Mōkau Marae and Huruiki meeting house is a meeting place of the Ngātiwai hapū of Te Uri o Hikihiki. The hapū also has another marae, Ōākura Marae, under construction.

Demographics
Ōakura is part of the Ōakura-Whangaruru South settlement.

References

Whangarei District
Populated places in the Northland Region